Tylopilus nebulosus is a species of bolete fungus in the family Boletaceae found in eastern North America. It was originally described by Charles Horton Peck in 1898 as a species of Boletus, from collections made in Ray Brook, New York. Carl B. Wolfe transferred it to the genus Tylopilus in 1980.

See also
List of North American boletes

References

External links

nebulosus
Fungi described in 1898
Fungi of North America
Taxa named by Charles Horton Peck